Maartensdijk is a village in the Dutch province of Utrecht. It is a part of the municipality of De Bilt, and lies about 4 km north of Bilthoven.

History
Maartensdijk was a separate municipality until 2001, when it merged with De Bilt. Until 1812 Maartensdijk was called Oostveen which is pronounced as 'oastfain'. Oostveen means "east fen". A fen is a wetland characterized by sphagnum moss, peat and an alkaline or neutral pH. Rendering this wetland into agricultural land was initiated by Bishop Godebald van Utrecht (1114–1127) when the Kromme Rijn ("Crooked Rhine") was dammed in 1122 at Wijk bij Duurstede. The same Bishop Godebald gave land development contracts to those who would completely drain this land and make it arable; Oostveen was a large section of this area. The oldest settlement in the area is the village of Voordorp, which gradually became known as Blauwkapel because the chapel's interior was entirely blue.  The name Voordorp has been revived and applied to a new northern district of the city of Utrecht. Blauwkapel still exists and is part of the Waterline and Fort defense system established to protect the provinces of Holland from inland invaders by flooding the land strategically and building fortresses where flooding was not feasible. Such a fort, the largest in this defense systems surrounds the old chapel. As land reclamation of Oostveen moved northward, a new settlement arose on the Oostveen lands that was dedicated by the dean of the Utrecht cathedral "in protectione et iustitia Sancti Martini". This settlement was the seat of the gerecht or canton of Oostveen, and in 1812 was renamed Maartensdijk.

Notable people 
 Nicolaas van Nieuwland (1510 in Maartensdijk – 1580), Bishop of Haarlem and abbot of Egmond Abbey 1562 to 1569
 Anne Sjerp Troelstra (1939 in Maartensdijk – 2019), math professor
 Madelon Hooykaas (born 1942 in Maartensdijk), video artist
Frans Rijnbout (born 1945 in Maartensdijk) theatre professor

References

Municipalities of the Netherlands disestablished in 2001
Populated places in Utrecht (province)
Former municipalities of Utrecht (province)
De Bilt